"I Should Have Known Better" is a song by The Beatles.

I Should Have Known Better may also refer to:
"I Should Have Known Better" (Jim Diamond song)
"I Should Have Known Better", a song by Wire on their album 154
"I Should Have Known Better", a song by Yo La Tengo on their album I Am Not Afraid of You and I Will Beat Your Ass

See also
Shoulda Known Better (disambiguation)
Should've Known Better (disambiguation)